Wirtz may refer to:

People 
 Arthur Wirtz (1901–1983), American businessman, owner of the Chicago Blackhawks & Bulls
 Bill Wirtz (1929–2007), American businessman, owner of the Chicago Blackhawks
 Carl Wilhelm Wirtz (1876–1939), German astronomer
 Ferd Wirtz (born 1885), Luxembourgian Olympic gymnast
 Florian Wirtz (born 2003), German football player
 Heinz Wirtz (born 1953), German football defender
 Jacques Wirtz (born 1924), Belgian landscape gardener
 Karl Wirtz (1910–1994), German nuclear physicist
 Kris Wirtz (born 1969), Canadian figure skater
 Mark Wirtz (1943–2020), Alsatian musician and pop record producer
 Paul Wirtz (died 2006), Canadian figure skater and skating coach
 Paul Wirtz (Swedish Pomerania) (died 17th-century), vice governour of Swedish Pomerania 1661–1664
 Patty Wirtz (born 1959), voice actress
 Reverend Billy C. Wirtz (born 1954), American comedic recording artist
 Rocky Wirtz (born 1952), current owner of the Chicago Blackhawks
 Sean Wirtz (born 1979), Canadian figure skater
 William Wirtz (American football) (1887–1965), American college sports coach
 W. Willard Wirtz (1912–2010), U.S. administrator, cabinet officer, attorney, and law professor

Places 
 Wirtz (crater), impact crater on Mars
 Wirtz, Virginia (Franklin County), populated place in the United States

See also